Mega Cabs is a radio taxi service provider in India, present in six cities in India with a fleet size of 2,500 cars. The company was founded in 2002 by Kunal Lalani. It is one of the first radio taxi service providers in India.

History 

Mega Cabs began its operations in 2002 in New Delhi. The company initially started with a fleet size of 50 cars and currently has a fleet of 2,500 cars. It is a part of the Association of Radio Taxis, a group of taxi service providers that operate taxi services which are regulated and licensed as opposed to technology-based companies like Uber. In 2020, the company changed its name to Mega Mobility.

Services 

Mega Cabs is a radio-call taxi service and offers dedicated airport transfers in the cities it operates in, and operates a luxury airport transfer service in Delhi/NCR. It also offers outstation services across different cities in India, and last-mile connectivity and employee transportation services. Cab bookings can be made using the website, through the hotline number, or the dedicated app available on all mobile platforms.

See also 
 Taxis in India

References 

2002 establishments in Delhi
Taxis of India
Transport companies established in 2002
Indian companies established in 2002